Eino Kirjonen became the third Finnish tournament winner at the tenth annual Four Hills Tournament. Against tradition, Innsbruck was the second single event, switching with Garmisch-Partenkirchen, which was held third.

Participating nations and athletes

The teams from Czechoslovakia and East Germany did not participate in Oberstdorf and Garmisch-Partenkirchen for political reasons.

Results

Oberstdorf
 Schattenbergschanze, Oberstdorf
28 December 1961

Innsbruck
 Bergiselschanze, Innsbruck
30 December 1961

Garmisch-Partenkirchen
 Große Olympiaschanze, Garmisch-Partenkirchen
01 January 1962

Bischofshofen
 Paul-Ausserleitner-Schanze, Bischofshofen
06 January 1962

In the overall lead ever since his dominating victory at the tournament's first event in Oberstdorf, Eino Kirjonen was 19.8 points in the lead before the final. In Bischofshofen, Kirjonen finished 12th. None of his closest pursuers, however, achieved a top result either (Silvennoinen 14th, Lindquist 24th, Schamov 10th). This allowed Bischofshofen victor Willi Egger to jump up from 9th to 2nd place in the overall ranking.

Final ranking

References

External links
 FIS website
 Four Hills Tournament web site

Four Hills Tournament
1961 in ski jumping
1962 in ski jumping